The Besòs is a river flowing through Catalonia, Spain, formed by the confluence of the Mogent and Congost rivers. It ends in the Mediterranean. Its full watershed includes the following cities: Aiguafreda, La Garriga, Sant Fost de Campsantelles, Canovelles, Granollers, Montmeló, Mollet del Vallès, Montcada i Reixac, Santa Coloma de Gramenet, Barcelona and Sant Adrià de Besòs. Due to its Mediterranean climate, the river can have extreme discrepancies in flow depending on the weather.

Tributaries 

The Besòs river has five main tributaries:
 Congost River
 Ripoll River
 Mogent River
 Tenes River
 de Caldes stream

History 

A non-navigable river, the Besòs was nonetheless a link between the Catalan coast and the interior. In the 10th century, the Rec Comtal was built to use the river for irrigation.

As it passes through a highly industrialized area (Barcelona metropolitan region), it had the dubious honor of being the most contaminated river in Europe during the 1970s and 1980s. Since the mid-1990s, however, the river has been in the process of recovery. 

The Fòrum Universal de les Cultures, which took place in Barcelona during 2004, allowed the creation of a recreation area called Parc Fluvial del Besòs between the cities of Barcelona, Santa Coloma de Gramenet and Sant Adrià del Besòs.

Gallery

See also 
 List of rivers of Spain
 Llobregat

References

Rivers of Spain
Rivers of Catalonia